The following is a list of shopping centers and malls in Jakarta, Indonesia.

Central Jakarta

 Cikini Gold Center
 Citra Xperience
 Citywalk Sudirman
 fX Sudirman
 Grand Indonesia Shopping Town
 Green Pramuka Square
 Harco Pasar Baru
 Harco Mas Mangga Dua
 Harmonie Exchange
 ITC Cempaka Mas
 ITC Roxy Mas
 Mangga Dua Mall
 Mega Glodok Kemayoran
 Menteng Central
 Menteng Huis
 Menteng Prada
 Metro Pasar Baru
 Metro Atom Pasar Baru
 Pasar Senen Jaya Blok 3
 Pasar Tanah Abang
 Plaza Atrium
 Plaza Indonesia
 Plaza Kenari Mas
 Plaza Senayan
 Pusat Grosir Metro Tanah Abang
 Pusat Grosir Senen Jaya
 Ratu Plaza
 Sarinah
 Senayan City
 Senayan Park
 Senayan Trade Centre
 Thamrin City

North Jakarta 

 Ancol Beach City Mall
 Baywalk Pluit
 Bella Terra Lifestyle Centre
 Pluit Village
 Emporium Pluit Mall
 Food Centrum
 Mal Artha Gading
 Mal Kelapa Gading
 Mall of Indonesia
 Mangga Dua Square
 Metro Sunter Plaza
 WTC Mangga Dua
 ITC Mangga Dua
 Pluit Junction
 PIK Avenue
 Koja Trade Mall
 Plaza Koja
 Sports Mall Kelapa Gading
 Sunter Mall

West Jakarta 

 Central Park Mall
 Citywalk Gajah Mada
 Glodok Plaza
 Grand Paragon
 Green Sedayu Mall
 Harco Glodok
 Lindeteves Trade Centre
 Lippo Mall Puri
 Lokasari Plaza
 Mall Ciputra
 Mall Matahari Daan Mogot
 Mal Puri Indah
 Mall Taman Anggrek
 Mall Taman Palem
 Neo Soho
 Pancoran Chinatown Point
 Plaza Pinangsia
 Pusat Grosir Asemka
PX Pavilion @ St. Moritz
 Seasons City
 Slipi Jaya Plaza

South Jakarta 

 ASHTA District 8
 Blok M Plaza
 Blok M Square
 Cilandak Town Square
 Epicentrum Walk
 Gandaria City
 ITC Fatmawati
 ITC Kuningan
 ITC Permata Hijau
 ITC Cipulir
Kota Kasablanka
Kalibata City Square
 Kuningan City
 Lippo Mall Kemang
 Lotte Shopping Avenue
 Mal Ambasador
 One Belpark
 Pacific Place
 Pejaten Village
 Plaza Festival
 Plaza Kalibata
 Plaza Semanggi
 Poins Square
 Pondok Indah Mall
 Setiabudi One
 The Dharmawangsa Square
 ÆON Mall Tanjung Barat
 Metro Mall Cipulir

East Jakarta 

 ÆON Mall Jakarta Garden City
 Arion Mall
 Buaran Plaza
 Cibubur Junction
 Cibubur Square
 Cipinang Indah Mall
 Ciplaz Klender
 Grand Cakung
 Jatinegara X'tainment
 Lippo Plaza Kramat Jati
 Mall @ Bassura
 MT Haryono Square
 Plaza Taman Modern
 Pusat Grosir Cililitan
 Pusat Grosir Jatinegara
 Rawamangun Square
 Tamini Square

Greater Jakarta

West Java

Bekasi 

 Grand Metropolitan Mall
 Mega Bekasi Hypermall
 Summarecon Mall Bekasi
 Metropolitan Mal 
 Revo Town
 Bekasi Cyber Park
 Grand Mal Bekasi
 Transpark Mall 
 BTC Square
 Grand Galaxy Park
 Pondok Gede Plaza
 Blu Plaza
 Lagoon Avenue Bekasi
 Mall Ciputra Cibubur

Depok

Bogor

Banten

Tangerang and South Tangerang

Defunctioned shopping malls 

 EX Plaza Indonesia

Gallery

See also 

 List of shopping malls in Indonesia

 
Shopping centers
Shopping malls, Jakarta
Jakarta